"" is the third single by Shiori Takei and released January 19, 2005 under Giza Studio label. The single reached #70 rank first week. It charted for 2 weeks and sold over 2,277 copies.

Track listing

References

2005 singles
2005 songs
Being Inc. singles
Giza Studio singles
Songs written by Aika Ohno